George Nicholls (25 June 1864 – 30 November 1943) was a British evangelical pastor, and Liberal-Labour politician who served as the Member of Parliament (MP) for North Northamptonshire from 1906 to 1910.

Nicholls started life as a farm labourer and smallholder. He went on to be Pastor at the Evangelist Congregational Church in Chatteris, Cambridgeshire, from 1894 to 1902, and afterwards of Congregational Churches at Silverdale and Chesterton, in Staffordshire.

He was elected as MP for North Northamptonshire at the 1906 general election, but was defeated at the January 1910 general election.

After his defeat he stood for Parliament again in Faversham at the December 1910 general election, and in Newmarket at a by-election in May 1913, but was unsuccessful on both occasions.

He was elected to Peterborough town council in 1912, and became the town's mayor from 1916 to 1918.

He was the chief organiser for the Allotment and Small Holdings section of the Agricultural Organisation Society, and a member of the Agricultural Wages Board, of a Royal Commission on Agriculture, of the Central Agricultural Council, of the Soke of Peterborough Small Holdings Committee, and of Peterborough United Charities. He was awarded the OBE and served as a Justice of the Peace.

After World War I, he stood unsuccessfully for Parliament on six further occasions. As a Labour Party candidate in Camborne at the 1918 general election, he narrowly lost to the sitting Liberal MP Sir Francis Dyke Acland.

References

External links 

UK MPs 1906–1910
1864 births
1943 deaths
Liberal Party (UK) MPs for English constituencies
Liberal-Labour (UK) MPs
English Congregationalist ministers
Mayors of Peterborough
Officers of the Order of the British Empire
English evangelists
English Christian religious leaders
English farmers
Presidents of the National Union of Agricultural and Allied Workers